The red-tailed soil-crevice skink (Austroablepharus kinghorni) is a species of skink, a lizard in the family Scincidae. The species is endemic to Australia.

References

Skinks of Australia
Reptiles described in 1947
Austroablepharus
Taxobox binomials not recognized by IUCN